Discospermum sphaerocarpum is a small tree of family Rubiaceae that is endemic to Sri Lanka. Sometimes due to various classifications it is accepted that the plant is also found in India. In Sri Lanka, this endemic species is commonly known as Tricalysia dalzellii in text books and field guides.

In culture 
The plant known as Tricalysia dalzellii is known as "vella" by Sri Lankans.

References 

 http://culturesheet.org/rubiaceae:discospermum:sphaerocarpum
 http://culturesheet.org/rubiaceae:tricalysia:dalzellii

External links 
 http://www.theplantlist.org/tpl/record/kew-63085
 http://indiabiodiversity.org/species/show/244707

Endemic flora of Sri Lanka
Coffeeae
Taxa named by Nicol Alexander Dalzell